Chaco may refer to:

Places in South America 
 Chaco Basin, spanning Argentina, Bolivia, and Paraguay
 Chaco Department, a historical department in Paraguay and proposed in Bolivia
 Chaco Province, a province in the northeastern part of Argentina
 Chaco National Park, a national park in Argentina
 Chaco (volcano), a volcano in Chile
 Chaco War, a war fought between Paraguay and Bolivia
 Gran Chaco, a region in South America historically divided into Chaco Austral, Chaco Central, and Chaco Boreal
 Gran Chaco people, several Native American tribes in Paraguay, Bolivia, Argentina, and Brazil
 Gran Chaco Province, a province in Tarija Department in Bolivia
 Humid Chaco, an ecoregion in South America

Places in North America
 Chaco Culture National Historical Park, historical and archaeological site in New Mexico
 Chaco River, intermittent river in New Mexico
 Chaco Wash, intermittent stream in New Mexico

Other uses
 Chaco (footwear), a brand of sandals and other footwear
 Chaco (spider), a spider genus in the family Nemesiidae pulchripes, a tarantula species
 Chaco golden knee, Grammostola
 Chaco (album), a 1995 album by Illya Kuryaki and the Valderramas
 Chaco (film), a 2020 Bolivian film
 Qaqun, a Palestinian Arab village depopulated in 1948
 Timeline of Chacoan history describing the history of Native Americans that once lived in northwest New Mexico and adjascant portions of Arizona and Colorado